The 2023 Louisville Cardinals football team will represent University of Louisville as a member of the Atlantic Coast Conference (ACC) during the 2023 NCAA Division I FBS football season. The Cardinals will be led by first-year head coach Jeff Brohm and play home games at the L&N Stadium in Louisville, Kentucky.

Schedule
Louisville and the ACC announced the 2023 football schedule on January 30, 2023. The 2023 season will be the conference's first season since 2004, that its scheduling format just includes one division. The new format sets Louisville with three set conference opponents, while playing the remaining ten teams twice in an (home and away) in a four–year cycle. The Cardinals three set conference opponents for the next four years is; Georgia Tech, Miami (FL), and Virginia.

References

Louisville Cardinals
Louisville Cardinals football seasons
Louisville Cardinals football